Air Pocket may refer to:

 Air pocket, a local difference in air pressure in the atmosphere, potentially causing vertical draft
 Air Pocket (album), a 1980 album by Roger Powell
 Air Pocket (band), a jazz fusion band founded by the Fowler brothers
Focal lung pneumatosis